Lewis Maitland Allen (June 27, 1922 Berryville, Virginia – December 8, 2003 New York City) was an American film producer and Tony Award winning Broadway producer.  He was married to screenwriter Jay Presson Allen. Allen was nominated for seven Tony Awards and won three, for Annie (1977), I'm Not Rappaport (1986) and Master Class (1996).

On Broadway, he was renowned for producing Annie and Master Class and in film was known for producing film versions of The Connection (1961), and Fahrenheit 451 (1966), plus both English language versions of Lord of the Flies released in 1963 and 1990.

References

External links

1922 births
2003 deaths
American film producers
People from Berryville, Virginia